Penelope Vincenzi (née Hannaford; 10 April 1939 – 25 February 2018) was a British novelist, who wrote 17 novels and 2 collections of stories. Her sales by 2014 amounted to over 7 million copies.

Early life
She was born Penelope Hannaford, on 10 April 1939 in Bournemouth, the daughter of Stanley George Hannaford (died 1985) and Mary Blanche Hannaford nee Hawkey (died 1987) of New Milton, Hampshire. She was an only child, with "the most ordinary background you could possibly imagine". As a child, the family moved to Devon. She was educated at Notting Hill and Ealing High School.

Career
In 1962, she started to work for the Daily Mirror as a secretary, and after a year was working for the women's editor Marjorie Proops, who knowing of her journalistic ambitions, let her help with research and small tasks.

Vincenzi was also a fashion journalist who worked for various publications, including the Daily Mirror and Vogue.

Personal life
She met her future husband Paul Robert Vincenzi, an advertising executive, the son of Dr Julius Vincenzi of Earls Colne, Essex, when she was 19. They married on 27 May 1960, and had four daughters. He died from a brain tumour in 2009.

Vincenzi died on 25 February 2018, aged 78.

Publications (novels)
The Compleat Liar (non-fiction, 1977)
Old Sins (1989)	
Wicked Pleasures (1992)	
An Outrageous Affair (1993)	
Another Woman (1994)	
Forbidden Places (1995)	
The Dilemma (1996)	
Windfall (1997)	
Almost a Crime (1999)	
No Angel (2000)
Something Dangerous (2001)	
Into Temptation (2002)
Sheer Abandon (2005)	
An Absolute Scandal (2007)	
The Best of Times (2009)	
The Decision (2011)	
A Perfect Heritage (2014)
A Question of Trust (2017)

References

1939 births
2018 deaths
British women novelists
20th-century British novelists
20th-century British women writers
21st-century British novelists
21st-century British women writers
British fashion journalists
British women journalists
Daily Mirror people
British Vogue
British romantic fiction writers
Women romantic fiction writers
Writers from Bournemouth
People educated at Notting Hill & Ealing High School
British people of Italian descent